The 1885 Atlantic hurricane season ran through the summer and the first half of fall in 1885. This is the period of each year when most tropical cyclones form in the Atlantic basin. In 1885 there were two tropical storms and six hurricanes in the Atlantic basin. However, in the absence of modern satellite monitoring and remote-sensing technologies, only storms that affected populated land areas or encountered ships at sea were recorded, so the actual total could be higher. An undercount bias of zero to six tropical cyclones per year between 1851 and 1885 and zero to four per year between 1886 and 1910 has been estimated.



Season summary 
The Atlantic hurricane database (HURDAT) recognizes eight tropical cyclones for 1885 in the Atlantic basin; two were tropical storms and six were hurricanes. The most significant storm of the season was Hurricane Two, which hit Georgia as a Category 2 hurricane, causing 25 deaths. The first cyclone was a tropical storm that existed in the Atlantic between August 7 and August 13 without making landfall. From north of Puerto Rico, Hurricane Two struck the Bahamas but then remained offshore until making a landfall in South Carolina. The hurricane caused considerable damage throughout the Carolinas, Georgia and Maryland. Also in August, Tropical Storm Three formed in the Gulf of Mexico, before crossing Florida and dissipating off South Carolina. Hurricane Four also grew from a tropical storm that formed in the Gulf of Mexico. It brought high winds and flooding to towns along the Gulf coast. This storm also crossed over Florida into the Atlantic and eventually made another landfall at New Brunswick as an extratropical storm. Hurricane Five existed in the tropical Atlantic between September 18 and September 21, without making landfall. Hurricane Six formed as a tropical storm in the Gulf of Mexico and reached hurricane strength off North Carolina a week later on October 2. The cyclone had impacted both Mississippi and Florida as it had travelled north. Hurricane Seven existed in the mid-Atlantic between September 26 and September 29. The last known cyclone of 1885 was Tropical Storm Eight which formed north of Cuba and impacted Florida. It travelled through the south-east United States and brought gales and flooding to the North Carolina coast.

Timeline 

.

Systems

Hurricane One 

A tropical storm was seen on August 7 to the southeast of Bermuda. It moved north-northeastward, and became a hurricane on August 8. It turned to the northeast, and passed offshore of Newfoundland on the 10th as a 90 mph (145 km/h) hurricane. The hurricane weakened over the north Atlantic Ocean, and became extratropical on the 14th.

Hurricane Two 

A tropical storm was first observed north of Puerto Rico on August 21. It moved to the west, hitting the Bahamas. It paralleled the coast of Florida and Georgia, remaining offshore until its South Carolina landfall on the 25th as a Category 2 hurricane. The hurricane passed across North Carolina just west of Wilmington and Hatteras. At Smithville (Southport) the anemometer was destroyed measuring a wind speed of 98 mph. The maximum wind speed was estimated at
125 mph. The hurricane weakened to a Category 1 hurricane as it accelerated to the northeast, but restrengthened to a 105 mph (169 km/h) Category 2 hurricane on the 27th. It became extratropical on August 28. The storm caused considerable damage at Wilmington, Smithville (Southport), Charleston and at Morehead City. The value of this damage was estimated at $1,790,000. Heavy rains and flooding were also seen across Maryland. At Ellicott City, Maryland lightning set fire to a residence causing damage worth $16,000.
 In total the hurricane caused 25 deaths.

Tropical Storm Three 

A tropical storm formed in the western Gulf of Mexico on August 29. It moved quickly to the northeast, and made landfall on extreme southeastern Louisiana on the 30th as a 60 mph (97 km/h) tropical storm. After crossing Florida, the storm was last seen off the coast of South Carolina on August 31.

Hurricane Four 

On September 17, a tropical storm developed in the western Gulf of Mexico near Veracruz, Mexico. It paralleled the Gulf of Mexico coastline to the northeast flooding coastal towns. After hitting southeastern Louisiana on September 21, the storm crossed Florida. Over the Western Atlantic, it strengthened to become a hurricane on the 22nd before becoming extratropical near its New Brunswick landfall on the 23rd. The storm brought flooding to Indianola and coastal flooding in the Galveston area. Four people died when a coal barge, the Orient, was cast adrift in the Gulf.

Hurricane Five 

From September 18 to the 21st, a hurricane existed in the tropical Atlantic Ocean to the northeast of the Lesser Antilles, peaking at 80 mph (129 km/h) before never being seen again.

Hurricane Six 

A tropical storm formed in the central Gulf of Mexico on September 24. It drifted northward, and hit southeastern Mississippi before turning eastward. It moved across the Florida panhandle and peninsula, and became a hurricane to the southeast of North Carolina on October 2. Its track after this point is unknown.

Hurricane Seven 

A tropical storm in the central Atlantic Ocean moved northward in late September, reaching 90 mph (145 km/h) winds before dissipating.

Tropical Storm Eight 

A tropical storm formed north of Cuba on October 10. It moved northward, and hit Florida as a strong tropical storm. It moved northeastward through the southeast United States, passing west of Jacksonville and later Savannah. It reached southwestern Virginia around midnight on October 12 and became extratropical on the 13th. Gales of 44-56 mph occurred along the North Carolina coast. High tides coincided with the storms passage and led to the waterfront at Smithville (Southport) being flooded.

See also 

 Atlantic hurricane season
 Tropical cyclone observation
 Atlantic hurricane reanalysis project

References

External links 
 HURDAT Data for the 1885 Atlantic hurricane season

 
Atlantic Hurricane Season, 1885
Articles which contain graphical timelines
1880s natural disasters